Bryan Edwards Sharratt (October 13, 1947 – August 16, 2007) was a United States Navy and Air Force officer, a lawyer, a Certified Public Accountant, a real estate broker, and a Democratic politician from Wyoming. After losing his Wyoming's at-large seat in the United States House of Representatives to Richard B. "Dick" Cheney in 1988, Sharratt campaigned for Bill Clinton for the presidency of the United States in 1992 and for John Kerry in 2004.

Sharratt graduated from Duke University in 1968 and then earned a J.D. degree from the Duke University School of Law in 1971. After graduation from law school, he joined the Navy Judge Advocate General's Corps. After completing his active duty commitment as a Navy lieutenant, Sharratt joined the Air Force Reserve. He continued his education by receiving an M.B.A. degree from the University of Wyoming in 1977. Sharratt retired from military service as an Air Force lieutenant colonel having earned three Meritorious Service Medals.

After his death from heart disease, Sharratt was interred at Arlington National Cemetery on November 5, 2007.

See also

References

Bryan Sharratt obituary
Defense link news article
Bryan Sharratt biography

1947 births
2007 deaths
People from Bethesda, Maryland
American Episcopalians
Duke University alumni
Duke University School of Law alumni
United States Navy officers
United States Air Force officers
Wyoming lawyers
University of Wyoming alumni
Recipients of the Meritorious Service Medal (United States)
American financial businesspeople
Wyoming Democrats
Clinton administration personnel
People from Arlington County, Virginia
Burials at Arlington National Cemetery